Akhil Bharatiya Ram Rajya Parishad (RRP, "All India Council of Ram's Kingdom") was an Indian Hindu nationalist political party founded by Swami Karpatri in 1948. The RRP won three Lok Sabha seats in the 1952 elections to the national Parliament and two in 1962. In 1952, 1957 and 1962, it won several dozen Vidhan Sabha seats, all in the Hindi belt, mostly in Rajasthan. Like other Hindutva-based parties, the RRP fought against the implementation of the Hindu code bills in India. The party eventually merged into the Jana Sangh, the precursor to the Bharatiya Janata Party.

Notes

References
 

Indian Hindu political parties
Defunct political parties in India
Political parties established in 1948
1948 establishments in India
Political parties with year of disestablishment missing
Far-right politics in India
Conservative parties in India
Political parties disestablished in 1971